The 2000 Rallye de Portugal (formally the 34th TAP Rallye de Portugal) was the fourth round of the 2000 World Rally Championship. The race was held over four days between 16 March and 19 March 2000, and was won by Subaru's Richard Burns, his 7th win in the World Rally Championship and second in a row this season.

Background

Entry list

Itinerary
All dates and times are WET (UTC±0).

Results

Overall

World Rally Cars

Classification

Special stages

Championship standings

FIA Cup for Production Rally Drivers

Classification

Special stages

Championship standings

References

External links
 Official website of the World Rally Championship

Portugal
Rally de Portugal
2000 in Portuguese motorsport